Istra may refer to:

Places
Istra (river), a river in Russia
Istra, Istrinsky District, Moscow Oblast, a town in Istrinsky District of Moscow Oblast, Russia
Istra, Krasnogorsky District, Moscow Oblast, an inhabited locality named Istra in Krasnogorsky District, Moscow Oblast
Istra Reservoir, a reservoir in Russia near Millerhof palace
Istra (Rauma), a river in Rauma municipality in Møre og Romsdal, Norway
Istra or Istria, a peninsula in the Adriatic Sea
Istria County, the Croatian portion of the Istria peninsula

Sports
FC Istra, an association football club in Russia
NK Istra, an association football club in Croatia
NK Istra 1961, an association football club in Croatia